Sexual sadism disorder is the condition of experiencing sexual arousal in response to the extreme pain, suffering or humiliation of others. Several other terms have been used to describe the condition, and the condition may overlap with other conditions that involve inflicting pain. It is distinct from situations in which consenting individuals use mild or simulated pain or humiliation for sexual excitement. The words sadism and sadist are derived from the French writer and libertine Marquis de Sade, who wrote several novels depicting sexualized torture and violence.

Related terms and conditions

Current terminology
Sexual sadism disorder is the term employed by the current version of the Diagnostic and Statistical Manual (DSM-5) of the American Psychiatric Association.  It refers to the "recurrent and intense sexual arousal from the physical or psychological suffering of another person, as manifested by fantasies, urges, or behaviors" (p. 696).  It is classified as one of the paraphilias, called an "algolagnic disorder" (p. 685), which is one of the "anomalous activity preferences" (p. 685).  The formal diagnosis of Sexual Sadism Disorder would apply if the individual has acted on these urges with a non-consenting person or if the urges cause significant distress to the individual.

Sadomasochism appears in the current version of the International Classification of Diseases (ICD-10) of the World Health Organization. It refers to the "preference for sexual activity that involves bondage or the infliction of pain or humiliation" (p. 172), and divides sadomasochism into sadism and masochism according to whether the individual prefers to be the provider or recipient of it.  The ICD-10 specifies that mild forms of sadomasochism "are commonly used to enhance otherwise normal sexual activity" (p. 172), and that the diagnosis would apply only if the behavior is preferred or required for sexual gratification.  The condition is classified as one of the disorders of sexual preference, which includes the paraphilias (p. 170).

Paraphilic coercive disorder refers to the preference for non-consenting over consenting sexual partners. It differs from sexual sadism disorder in that although the individual with this disorder may inflict pain or threats of pain in order to gain the compliance of the victim, the infliction of pain is not the individual's actual goal. The condition is typically described as a paraphilia and continues to undergo research, but does not appear in the current DSM or ICD.  Alternate terms for the condition have included Biastophilia, Coercive Paraphilic Disorder, and Preferential Rape.

BDSM or "bondage/discipline dominance/submission sadomasochism" is a colloquial term referring to the subculture of individuals who willingly engage in consenting forms of mild or simulated pain or humiliation. It is not currently a diagnosable condition in either the DSM or ICD system.  Alternative terms have included Bondage and Discipline (B&D), Domination and Submission (D&S), and Sadism and Masochism (S&M). In scientific research, this sexual preference has also been called the hyperdominance pattern of sexual behavior.  Unlike individuals with sexual sadism disorder or paraphilic coercive disorder, individuals with hyperdominance seek to provoke pleasure in their partner(s) with the pain/humiliation.

Previous terminology
Sexual sadism is the term previously employed by the DSM-III-R, DSM-IV, and DSM-IV-TR, where it was classified as a paraphilia.  In these versions of the DSM, sexual sadism pertained only to the infliction of real (not simulated) suffering (p. 530).  The condition was renamed sexual sadism disorder in DSM-5.

Sexual sadism was the term employed in the DSM-III, classifying the condition as a paraphilia.  The DSM-III noted that "the imagery in a Paraphilia, such as simulated bondage, may be playful and harmless and acted out with a mutually consenting partner….In more extreme form, paraphilic imagery is acted out with a nonconsenting partner, and is noxious and injurious to the partner" (p. 267). In DSM-III, sexual sadism could be diagnosed if:
 the person repeatedly and intentionally inflicted suffering on a nonconsenting person, to experience sexual excitement
 repeatedly or exclusively preferred simulated or mild suffering with a consenting sexual partner
 employs extensive, permanent, or potentially fatal suffering to achieve sexual excitement, regardless of the consent of the other person.

Sadism was the term employed by the DSM-II.  In that manual, the condition was classified as a sexual deviation, which was used to describe "individuals whose sexual interests are directed primarily toward…coitus performed under bizarre circumstances" (p. 44).  The term "paraphilia" did not exist in the DSM-II, and diagnoses did not have specific criteria until DSM-III.

Sexual sadism was the phrase mentioned in DSM-I as one of the sexual deviations (p. 39), but neither it (nor any of the other sexual deviations) received a specific label or diagnostic criteria.  The term paraphilia did not exist in the DSM-II, and diagnoses did not have specific criteria until DSM-III.

Sadistic personality disorder does not actually refer to any sexual interest, and instead refers to the pervasive disregard for the well-being of others.  It is usually associated with a history of violence and criminality (which can include, but is not limited to sexual crimes).

Features
With paraphilic coercive disorder, the individual employs enough force to subdue a victim, but with sexual sadism disorder, the individual often continues to inflict harm regardless of the compliance of the victim, which sometimes escalates not only to the death of the victim, but also to the mutilation of the body.  What is experienced by the sadist as sexual does not always appear obviously sexual to non-sadists: sadistic rapes do not necessarily include penile penetration of the victim.  In a survey of offenses, 77% of cases included sexual bondage, 73% included anal rape, 60% included blunt force trauma, 57% included vaginal rape, and 40% included penetration of the victim by a foreign object.  In 40% of cases, the offender kept a personal item of the victim as a souvenir.

On personality testing, sadistic rapists apprehended by law enforcement have shown elevated traits of impulsivity, hypersexuality, callousness, and psychopathy.

Although there appears to be a continuum of severity from mild (hyperdominance or BDSM) to moderate (paraphilic coercive disorder) to severe (sexual sadism disorder), it is not clear if they are genuinely related or only appear related superficially.

Very little is known about how sexual sadism disorder develops.  Most of the people diagnosed with sexual sadism disorder come to the attention of authorities by committing sexually motivated crimes. Surveys have also been conducted to include people who are interested in only mild and consensual forms of sexual pain/humiliation (BDSM).

Most people with full-blown sexual sadism disorder are male, whereas the sex ratio of people interested in BDSM is closer to 2:1 male-to-female.

People with sexual sadism disorder are at an elevated likelihood of having other paraphilic sexual interests.

Typology
Criminologist Lee Mellor created a six typology of sexually sadistic homicide offenders, based upon a combination of three binary factors:                             Destructive versus Preservative: Destructive sex sadists mutilate the bodies of their living victims, while Preservative sex sadists do not.                                          Prolonged versus Brief:  The Prolonged sex sadist tortures their victim for an hour or more, while the Brief sex sadist does so over less time.                                            Elaborate versus Simple: Where Simple sex sadists tend to use one or two methods of torture, Elaborate sadists have three of the following four characteristics, (i) variation in torture methods, (ii) complex torture apparatus, (iii) psychological torture, (iv) record making (e.g., using notes/media to document the process).          This renders eight possible categories, six of which Mellor was able to find multiple criminal offenders to exemplify:

This typology is compatible with the necrophilia typology, producing hybrid categories which help to understand the totality of the offender's paraphilic desires.

See also
 Sexual masochism disorder
 Biastophilia
 Lust murder
 Marquis de Sade, after whom sadism is named
 Sadistic personality disorder

References

External links 

Paraphilias